Vitória Atlético Clube do Bié, is a sports club from Kuito, Angola. The club is notably one of the debutants of the Girabola, having participated in its first edition in 1979, as a last-minute replacement for Desportivo de Camacupa, also from Bié.

The club made history in the Girabola as it was one of their players, a late Domingos Adriano aka Minguito who scored the first goal in the Angolan football championship.

After that initial participation, in spite of several participations in the Gira Angola -the second division- the club has never returned to the Angolan premier league.

In 2017, the club participated in the Angolan second division, the Gira Angola.

League & Cup Positions

Staff

Chairman history
 Jorge Dongo 2004–2012
 Joaquim Novato 2012–

Players

2017

1979
Vitória do Bié 1979

See also
Girabola

References

External links
Girabola.com profile
Facebook profile 1
Facebook profile 2

Football clubs in Angola
Sports clubs in Angola